About a Boy is the second album by English singer-songwriter Badly Drawn Boy (Damon Gough), released in 8 April 2002 under Twisted Nerve Records and XL Recordings, and in America under the short-lived ARTISTdirect Records, as the soundtrack to the film About a Boy. Gough was chosen to compose and perform the entire soundtrack.

In his book 31 Songs, About a Boy author Nick Hornby lists Gough's track "A Minor Incident" as one of the songs that has had an effect on his life.

Track listing

Personnel
 Damon Gough – vocals, acoustic guitar, electric guitar, bass, piano, synthesizer, keyboards, celeste, Fender Rhodes, xylophone, harmonica, backing vocals, horns, strings, flute, percussion, triangle, co-producer

 Additional musicians
 Sasha Krivstsov – bass
 Joey Waronker – drums
 Pete Thomas – drums
 Tom Rothrock – drum programming, synth sweeps, synth, bass, co-producer
 Jon Brion – fuzz guitar, Chamberlin, bass, vibes, voices
 Mike Brenner – lap steel, lap steel noises
 Steve McLaughlin – keyboards, co-producer
 Patrick Seymour – keyboards, conductor
 Jonathan Reese – orchestra leader
 Pete Beechill – trombone
 Jeff Turmes – saxophone
 Chuy Flores – backward noises
 Suzie Katayyama – orchestra arranger & conductor
 Sharon Celani – backing vocals
 Gia Ciambotti – backing vocals
 Ashley Arrison – backing vocals
 London Metropolitan Orchestra – strings

Charts

Weekly charts

Year-end charts

References

Badly Drawn Boy albums
Albums produced by Tom Rothrock
2002 soundtrack albums
XL Recordings soundtracks
Romance film soundtracks
Comedy film soundtracks
Drama film soundtracks